Confession Concerning Christ's Supper (1528) is a theological treatise written by Martin Luther affirming the Real Presence of the body and blood of Christ in the Eucharist, defining Luther's position as the sacramental union. Notable among its respondents were Huldrych Zwingli and Johannes Oecolampadius, who denied the Real Presence. Luther also discussed the eucharistic views of John Wycliffe in this document. The third part of the work is a concise confession of Luther's Christian faith.

Original German text
 Luthers Werk: Weimarer Ausgabe, vol. 26, pp. 261–509
 Martin Luther: Studienausgabe, vol. 4, pp. 13–258

English translation
 Luther's Works: American Edition, vol. 37, pp. 161–372

Works by Martin Luther
Lutheran Eucharistic theology
1528 books
16th-century Christian texts